María Bramont-Arias (born 13 August 1999) is a Peruvian swimmer. She competed in the women's 1500 metre freestyle event at the 2017 World Aquatics Championships.

In 2019, she won the women's 5 km events at the South American Beach Games. Four months later she competed in the women's 5 km and women's 10 km events at the 2019 World Aquatics Championships held in Gwangju, South Korea. In the 5 km event she finished in 10th place and in the 10 km event she finished in 26th place. In 2019, she also competed in the women's marathon 10 kilometres at the 2019 Pan American Games held in Lima, Peru. She finished in 7th place.

Major Results

Individual

Long course

Open water swimming

Relay

Long course

References

External links
 

1999 births
Living people
Peruvian female long-distance swimmers
Place of birth missing (living people)
South American Games bronze medalists for Peru
South American Games medalists in swimming
Competitors at the 2018 South American Games
Swimmers at the 2019 Pan American Games
Pan American Games competitors for Peru
20th-century Peruvian women
21st-century Peruvian women